Chandrashekhar S. Jog is a professor in the department of mechanical engineering at Indian Institute of Science. He works  in the areas of Solid mechanics, Continuum mechanics, and Finite element methods. He has authored books on Continuum mechanics, and Fluid mechanics.

References

Living people
Academic staff of the Indian Institute of Science
Mechanical engineers
Year of birth missing (living people)
Place of birth missing (living people)